GCash is a Philippine mobile wallet, mobile payments and branchless banking service. Introduced in 2004, it is owned by Mynt (formerly Globe Fintech Innovations, Inc.), which is a joint venture between Ant Group, an affiliate company of the Alibaba Group and the operator of the world's leading open digital lifestyle platform, Alipay; Ayala Group of Companies, one of the Philippines' largest business conglomerates; and Globe Group, one of the Philippines' largest telecommunications companies (Mynt is listed as a subsidiary of 917Ventures).

As of 2019, it had 20 million active users and more than 63,000 partner merchants in the Philippines. However, in two years, owing to the rise of digital payments in the Philippines due to the COVID-19 pandemic, these figures more than doubled, with 46 million active users and 2.5 million merchants and sellers as of August 2021, making GCash the country's undisputed mobile wallet giant. As of May 2022, it has more than 60 million users.

History

GCash was first launched by Globe Telecom in October 2004, offering SMS-based domestic money transfer that does not require bank accounts or cards considering 80% of the Philippine population were unbanked or underbanked at the time.

In 2012, the GCash app was launched as a move to transition from cash-in and cash-out outlets to a fully cashless system.

In 2017, GCash, along with competitor mobile wallet PayMaya, partnered with Facebook to integrate its services with Facebook Messenger.

In 2020, GCash partnered with Philippine Seven Corporation allowing the use of the GCash app to pay in 7-Eleven branches via barcode throughout the country. 7-Eleven also has its own CLIQQ Wallet system for cashless transactions and its branches are one of the cash-in locations for GCash users. Later that year, GCash partnered with another convenience store chain, Ministop, to add more cash-in locations in the Philippines.

On July 25, 2021, GCash announced that its remittance service, GCash Padala, is now available to non-app users through its 2,000 partners nationwide.

In November 2021, GCash's parent company, Mynt, announced that it raised $300M in funding at a $2B valuation, making Mynt a Philippine double unicorn.

In August 2022, GCash Jr., which is designed for users aged 7 to 17, was launched.

Issues

On January 11, 2022, the GCash mobile application and its services were briefly interrupted due to a power outage that lasted for four hours.

One issue related to GCash is that some users have reported experiencing transaction errors, including failed or delayed transactions, incorrect debits, and missing funds. This can cause inconvenience and frustration for users, especially when they need to urgently use their funds for payments or transfers. Some users have also reported difficulties in getting their concerns resolved through customer support, which can further exacerbate the issue. Additionally, there have been reports of fraud and scams involving GCash accounts, which highlights the importance of being cautious and vigilant when using mobile payment services.

References

External links
 

Alibaba Group
Ayala Corporation subsidiaries
Mobile payments in the Philippines
Payment service providers
Philippine brands